Dumbreck is an area in the city of Glasgow, Scotland. It is situated south of the River Clyde.

Dumbreck is a conservation area.

The district is served by Dumbreck railway station. The only church in Dumbreck is St Leo the Great RC church.

Notable people 

 Archie Meiklem, Scottish footballer

See also
 Glasgow tower blocks

References 

Areas of Glasgow
Pollokshields